The battle of Paraguarí took place on January 19, 1811, in Paraguarí, Paraguay, between the patriot army led by Manuel Belgrano and the Royalist army located in Paraguay led by Bernardo de Velasco. The battle would end with a Paraguayan victory; but it boosted confidence in the local population to declare themselves independent from both Buenos Aires patriots and royalists months later.

Background 
At the outbreak of the May Revolution in Buenos Aires, capital of the Viceroyalty of the Río de la Plata, the government emerged from it, called (in Spanish) Junta Provisional Gubernativa de las Provincias del Río de la Plata a nombre del señor don Fernando VII, invited other cities and provinces of the same to join the Revolution. The invitation, in fact, left no room for refusal, and every gesture in the sense of preserving the pre-revolutionary government was interpreted as hostile.

The main threats came from Cordoba, Upper Peru, Montevideo and Asuncion. The first two were defeated with relative ease, but Montevideo would stand firm in their opposition for four years.

Paraguayan governor, Bernardo de Velasco, refused to recognize the authority of the Board, as a result of an open cabildo in Asuncion that decided to keep the loyalty to the Regency Counsel of Spain. Unaware of this, and assuming that the Paraguayan patriots were stronger than they were, the Junta sent a small military expedition, commanded by one of its members, Manuel Belgrano, to unite the territory governed by Paraguay, through negotiations or through force. The issue was raised as it passed through Santa Fe, but the invitation to recognize the authority of the Junta was rejected.

Belgrano entered into Paraguayan territory, overcoming  slight resistance in the battle of Campichuelo.  Belgrano crossed the Tebicuary River on 11 January, finding abandoned villages since Velasco evacuated them with his retreat.

During the night of January 15, Belgrano sent a vanguard of 200 men and 2 guns to surprise the Paraguayans, but the attack never took place. The next morning, the Argentine general was positioned himself on a hill, from where he watched the Paraguayan camp. Although the enemy force at least exceeded theirs by a ratio of ten to one, decided to attack without exhausting the possibilities to negotiate.

Although Belgrano had sent several proclamations to the Paraguayans, inviting them to act by the revolution, Velasco banned all such pamphlets.  Belgrano considered if he succeeded,  it would open the entrance to Asuncion. And if he was defeated, at least his army was far enough inside enemy territory to avoid being completely expelled. On the other hand, it is possible that he and his officers despised the combat capability of Paraguayans and overestimated the possibility of inspiring patriotic enthusiasm.

The battle
Belgrano organized his infantry into two rows of 220 and 240 men, and placed Machain's cavalry on the right and Perdriel's on the left (100 riders each).  In reserve back at Cerro Mbae, were 70 riders and militia guarding the baggage train.
 

After ordering that his troops mass out 3:00 in the morning on January 19, Belgrano ordered the advance. An hour later, the fighting was widespread. The attack came as a surprise to the Paraguayans, forcing them to abandon their positions. The governor Velasco fled towards Asuncion. But the cavalry, commanded by Manuel Cabañas withdrew without fighting and deployed on the flanks of the attacking army.

The patriots were distracted in looting the food stores of the Paraguayan army, so that only half of the force continued to fight, while the defenders were rearming themselves. To make matters worse, when Belgrano sent reinforcements of about 120 men, under the command of his aide Ramon Espindola, in support of Machain.  Machain believing they were the enemy, ordereded a retreat.

Amidst the confusion, the Paraguayan wings commanded by Gamarra and Cabanas, surrounded Espindola and Machain.  Machain escaped but Espindola was killed.

Considering that everything was lost, Belgrano ordered a withdrawal to the south.

Consequences
The Battle of Paraguari was not a final victory for the Paraguayan royalists. Belgrano still had his army. But the colonial government had been saved, and the province could not be compelled to submit to the government of Buenos Aires.

Weeks later, Belgrano would definitely be defeated at the battle of Tacuarí and expelled from Paraguay.

When, months later, Paraguay declared its independence from Spain, would make clear that none were willing to go to Buenos Aires. And when the successive governments of Buenos Aires is clearly likely to show the other provinces to deny equal rights, Paraguay affirm this trend in a final independence.

References

External links
 Instituto Nacional Belgraniano 

Battles of the Spanish American wars of independence
Battles involving Paraguay
Conflicts in 1811
History of Paraguarí Department
January 1811 events